Flint Hill Baptist Church is a historic Southern Baptist church in Flint Hill, Rappahannock County, Virginia. The original section was built in 1854 and expanded and remodeled in the 1890s in the Late Victorian style. The original section is a one-story, gable-roofed, frame-and-weatherboard rectangular structure. Later additions are the front entrance tower topped with a belfry and Sunday school rooms to the rear. It features six stained-glass windows. Also on the property is the contributing church cemetery. Among those buried in the churchyard is Confederate Private Albert Gallatin Willis, one of Mosby's Rangers and a seminarian who offered himself for execution in the place of a married comrade-in-arms; the grave is noted with a marker in the Civil War Trails series.

It was added to the National Register of Historic Places in 1997 and included in the Flint Hill Historic District in 2012.

References

Churches on the National Register of Historic Places in Virginia
Baptist churches in Virginia
Victorian architecture in Virginia
Churches completed in 1854
Buildings and structures in Rappahannock County, Virginia
National Register of Historic Places in Rappahannock County, Virginia
Individually listed contributing properties to historic districts on the National Register in Virginia
Southern Baptist Convention churches
1854 establishments in Virginia